Adam Cwalina (born 26 January 1985) is a Polish badminton player. He competed in men's doubles event at the 2012 Summer Olympics with Michał Łogosz and 2016 Summer Olympics with Przemysław Wacha.

Achievements

BWF Grand Prix 
The BWF Grand Prix had two levels, the Grand Prix and Grand Prix Gold. It was a series of badminton tournaments sanctioned by the Badminton World Federation (BWF) and played between 2007 and 2017.

Men's doubles

  BWF Grand Prix Gold tournament
  BWF Grand Prix tournament

BWF International Challenge/Series 
Men's doubles

Mixed doubles

  BWF International Challenge tournament
  BWF International Series tournament

References

External links 
 
 
 
 

1985 births
Living people
Sportspeople from Częstochowa
Polish male badminton players
Badminton players at the 2012 Summer Olympics
Badminton players at the 2016 Summer Olympics
Olympic badminton players of Poland
Badminton players at the 2019 European Games
European Games competitors for Poland